The Green Party is a green political party in the Czech Republic.

History
The Green party was founded in 1990 following the return to liberal democracy in Czechia following the Velvet Revolution. However, the party remained on the political margins until Jaromír Štětina was able to capture a seat in the Senate (upper house of the Parliament of the Czech Republic) in 2004. It was during this time that the Greens campaigned on pacificism (rejecting the idea that any foreign military power should have military bases in the Czech Republic) and greater incorporation of grassroots democracy in the country.  

Under new leader Marin Bursík, the Greens adopted a more pragmatic approach to politics and in the subsequent 2006 legislative election the party received 6.3% of the vote and won six seats in the lower house – the Chamber of Deputies. This resulted in the party taking part in the governing coalition, together with the Civic Democrats (ODS) and KDU–ČSL from January 2007 to March 2009 (for more details see Mirek Topolánek's Second Cabinet). During their stint in government, the Greens promoted pro-European policies such as supporting the Lisbon Treaty. They also suggested that European based defence alliance could be an alternative option to Czech membership of NATO. However, following the installation of a new American radar system in the Czech Republic there were tensions within the party over foreign policy. The party was also a supporter of minority rights, immigrants rights and gender rights.

The Green Party was unable to repeat its success in 2010 elections, losing all seats in both chambers.

In the party's 2022 leadership election the incumbent co-leaders, Magdalena Davis and Michal Berg, were elected for another term.

Election results

Chamber of Deputies of the Czech Republic

Senate
 1996 Senate: no seats
 1998 Senate: no seats
 2000 Senate: no seats
 2002 Senate: no seats
 2004 Senate: 1 seat (Jaromír Štětina)
 2006 Senate: no seats
 2008 Senate: no seats
 2010 Senate: no seats
 2012 Senate: 1 seat separately (Eliška Wagnerová) and 1 seat together with Pirates and Christian Democrats (Libor Michálek)
 2014 Senate by-election: 1 seat (Ivana Cabrnochová) together with Social Democrats
 2014 Senate: 2 seats
 2016 Senate: 1 seat, 1 together with Christian Democrats (Petr Orel) and 1 together with Pirates and local Prague movement HPP11 (Ladislav Kos)
 2018 Senate: 1 seat
 2020 Senate: 1 seat
 2022 Senate: 0 seats

Presidential

European parliament

Logos

See also

Green party
Green politics
List of environmental organizations
Renewable energy in the Czech Republic

Footnotes

External links
Profile of party – From European Greens website (in English)
Official party website (in Czech)

 
Green political parties in the Czech Republic
Green liberalism
Social liberal parties
Political parties established in 1990
Global Greens member parties
Pro-European political parties in the Czech Republic
1990 establishments in Czechoslovakia